Hồ Xuân Hương (胡春香; 1772–1822) was a Vietnamese poet born at the end of the Lê dynasty. She grew up in an era of political and social turmoil – the time of the Tây Sơn rebellion and a three-decade civil war that led to Nguyễn Ánh seizing power as Emperor Gia Long and starting the Nguyễn dynasty. She wrote poetry using chữ Nôm (Southern Script), which adapts Chinese characters for writing demotic Vietnamese. She is considered to be one of Vietnam's greatest classical poets. Xuân Diệu, a prominent modern poet, dubbed her "The Queen of Nôm poetry".

Biography
The facts of her life are difficult to verify, but this much is well established: she was born in Nghệ An Province near the end of the rule of the Trịnh lords, and moved to Hanoi while still a child. The best guess is that she was the youngest daughter of Hồ Phi Diễn.

According to the first researchers of Hồ Xuân Hương, such as Nguyễn Hữu Tiến and Dương Quảng Hàm, she was a daughter of Hồ Phi Diễn (born in 1704) in Quỳnh Đôi Village, Quỳnh Lưu District, Nghệ An Province (*). Hồ Phi Diễn acquired the baccalaureate diploma at the age of 24, under Lê Dụ Tông's reign. Due to his family's poverty, he had to work as a tutor in Hải Hưng, Hà Bắc for his earnings. At that place, he cohabitated with a girl from Bắc Ninh, his concubine – Hồ Xuân Hương was born as a result of that love affair.

Nevertheless, in a paper in Literature Magazine (No. 10, Hanoi 1964), Trần Thanh Mại claims that Hồ Xuân Hương's hometown was the same as mentioned above, but she was a daughter of Hồ Sĩ Danh (1706–1783) and a younger stepsister of Hồ Sĩ Đống (1738–1786)"

She became locally famous and obtained a reputation of creating poems that were subtle and witty. She is believed to have married twice as her poems refer to two different husbands: Vĩnh Tường (a local official) and Tổng Cóc (a slightly higher level official). She was the second-rank wife of Tổng Cóc, in Western terms, a concubine, a role that she was clearly not happy with ("like the maid/but without the pay"). However, her second marriage did not last long as Tổng Cóc died just six months after the wedding.

She lived the remainder of her life in a small house near the West Lake in Hanoi. She had visitors, often fellow poets, including two specifically named men: Scholar Tôn Phong Thi and a man only identified as "The Imperial Tutor of the Nguyễn Family." She was able to make a living as a teacher and evidently was able to travel since she composed poems about several places in Northern Vietnam.

A single woman in a Confucian society, her works show her to be independent-minded and resistant to societal norms, especially through her socio-political commentaries and her use of frank sexual humor and expressions. Her poems are usually irreverent, full of double entendres, and erudite.

Legacy
By composing the vast majority of her works in Nôm, she helped to elevate the status of Vietnamese as a literary language. Recently, however, some of her poems have been found which were composed in classical Chinese, indicating that she was not a purist. In modern times, Chữ nôm is nearly a dead script, having been supplanted by Quốc Ngữ, a Latin alphabet introduced during the period of French colonization. For details, see Vietnamese language. Some of her poems were collected and translated into English in John Balaban's Spring Essence (Copper Canyon Press, 2000).

An important Vietnamese poet and her contemporary is Nguyễn Du, who similarly wrote poetry in demotic Vietnamese, and so helped to found a national literature.

A few cities in Vietnam have streets named after Hồ Xuân Hương.

Works

The Jackfruit (Quả Mít, 果櫗)

The Cake That Drifts In Water (Bánh Trôi Nước, 𩛄𬈼渃) 

 "Thân em vừa trắng lại vừa tròn," (literally, my body is white and round like the cake in the water)
 "Ba chìm bảy nổi với nước non." (literally, sunk down three times, floated up seven times; this refers to the up and downs in life)
 "Rắn nát mặc dầu tay kẻ nặn," (literally, hard and crumbled through the hands of the molder)

The Unfortunate Plight of Women (Thân phận người đàn bà, 身份𠊛彈婆)

References

Sources

 Forbes, Andrew, and Henley, David: Vietnam Past and Present: The North (History and culture of Hanoi and Tonkin). Chiang Mai. Cognoscenti Books, 2012.
Outstanding Vietnamese Women Before the 20th Century published in English by The Gioi Publishers, 2006.
Hồ Xuân Hương, nha tho cach mang (Hồ Xuân Hương - A Revolutionary Poet) by Hoa Bang, 1982.

External links 

John Balaban's translations of Hồ Xuân Hương's works into English
New York Times review of the translation, with background information
NPR Interview with John Balaban
Hồ Xuân Hương at Nom Foundation

1772 births
1822 deaths
People from Nghệ An province
Vietnamese Confucianists
Vietnamese women poets
People of Revival Lê dynasty
18th-century Vietnamese poets
19th-century Vietnamese women
18th-century Vietnamese women
Nguyễn dynasty poets